In mathematics, the Laurent series of a complex function  is a representation of that function as a power series which includes terms of negative degree. It may be used to express complex functions in cases where a Taylor series expansion cannot be applied. The Laurent series was named after and first published by Pierre Alphonse Laurent in 1843.  Karl Weierstrass may have discovered it first in a paper written in 1841, but it was not published until after his death.

Definition
The Laurent series for a complex function  about a point  is given by

The expansion for  will then be valid anywhere inside the annulus. The annulus is shown in red in the figure on the right, along with an example of a suitable path of integration labeled . If we take  to be a circle , where , this just amounts
The fact that these integrals are unchanged by a deformation of the contour  is an immediate consequence of Green's theorem. 

However, this is the same as when  (see the example below). 

In practice, the above integral formula may not offer the most practical method for computing the coefficients
 for a given function ; instead, one often pieces together the Laurent series by combining known Taylor expansions. Because the Laurent expansion of a function is unique whenever
it exists, any expression of this form that equals the given function 

Convergent Laurent series 

Laurent series with complex coefficients are an important tool in complex analysis, especially to investigate the behavior of functions near singularities.

The graph opposite shows  in black and its Laurent approximations

for  = 1, 2, 3, 4, 5, 6, 7 and 50. As , the approximation becomes exact for all (complex) numbers  except at the singularity .

More generally, Laurent series can be used to express holomorphic functions defined on an annulus, much as power series are used to express holomorphic functions defined on a disc.

Suppose 

is a given Laurent series with complex coefficients  and a complex center . Then there exists a unique inner radius  and outer radius  such that:
 The Laurent series converges on the open annulus . To say that the Laurent series converges, we mean that both the positive degree power series and the negative degree power series converge. Furthermore, this convergence will be uniform on compact sets. Finally, the convergent series defines a holomorphic function  on the open annulus.
 Outside the annulus, the Laurent series diverges.
 On the boundary of the annulus, one cannot make a general statement, except to say that there is at least one point on the inner boundary and one point on the outer boundary such that  cannot be holomorphically continued to those points.

These radii can be computed as follows:

We take  to be infinite when this latter lim sup is zero.

As an example, consider the following rational function, along with its partial fraction expansion:

However, there are three possible Laurent expansions about 0, depending on the radius of :

(The "inner" Taylor series expansion can be obtained similarly, just reversing the term order in the division algorithm.)

The case ; i.e., a holomorphic function  which may be undefined at a single point , is especially important. For an example of this, consider

We find that the residue is 2.

One example for expanding about :

Uniqueness 
Suppose a function  holomorphic on the annulus   has two Laurent series:

Substituting the identity

into the summation yields

Hence the Laurent series is unique.

Laurent polynomials 

A Laurent polynomial is a Laurent series in which only finitely many coefficients are non-zero. Laurent polynomials differ from ordinary polynomials in that they may have terms of negative degree.

Principal part 
The principal part of a Laurent series is the series of terms with negative degree, that is

Multiplication and sum 
Laurent series cannot in general be multiplied.
Algebraically, the expression for the terms of the product may involve infinite sums which need not converge (one cannot take the convolution of integer sequences).
Geometrically, the two Laurent series may have non-overlapping annuli of convergence.

Thus when defining formal Laurent series, one requires Laurent series with only finitely many negative terms.

Similarly, the sum of two convergent Laurent series need not converge, though it is always defined formally, but the sum of two bounded below Laurent series (or any Laurent series on a punctured disk) has a non-empty annulus of convergence.

Also, for a field , by the sum and multiplication defined above, formal Laurent series would form a field  which is also the field of fractions of the ring  of formal power series.

See also 
 Puiseux series
 Mittag-Leffler's theorem
 Formal Laurent series Laurent series considered formally, with coefficients from an arbitrary commutative ring, without regard for convergence, and with only finitely many negative terms, so that multiplication is always defined.
 Z-transform the special case where the Laurent series is taken about zero has much use in time-series analysis.
 Fourier series the substitution  transforms a Laurent series into a Fourier series, or conversely. This is used in the q-series expansion of the j-invariant.
 Padé approximant Another technique used when a Taylor series is not viable.

References

External links 
 
 
 
 Laurent Series and Mandelbrot set by Robert Munafo

Complex analysis
Series expansions